Between the Earth and the Stars is the debut album of American country music singer Jeff Wood. It was released on February 11, 1997, through Imprint Records. The album includes the singles "You Just Get One", "Use Mine" and "You Call That a Mountain".

Content
"You Just Get One" was originally recorded by Ty Herndon on his 1995 debut What Mattered Most, and B. J. Thomas later released his version of "You Call That a Mountain" in 2000 from his album of the same name. Billy Hoffman also recorded the song on his 2000 album All I Wanted Was You. Bonnie Tyler covered the title track on her 2019 album of the same name.

Critical reception
Jeffrey B. Remz of Country Standard Time described the album as "pleasant enough sounding" and "usually maintain[ing] country sensibilities" although Remz said that it "produce[d] no surprises". Allmusic critic Jack Leaver, who gave the album two-and-a-half stars out of five, called it "a mostly mellow set[…]that should appeal to the fans of the Dave Loggins-meets-John Berry school of country pop." The San Antonio Express-News called it an "impressive debut".

Track listing
"You Call That a Mountain" (Michael Garvin, Bucky Jones) - 3:26
"Too Late to Turn It Around" (Jeff Wood, John Scott Sherrill, Simon Wilson) - 3:52
"There's No Place Like You" (Wood, Vernon Rust) - 4:11
"Long Way from OK" (Wood, Gary Burr, Pat McDonald) - 3:32
"Time to Move On" (Monty Powell, Eric Silver) - 3:28
"You Just Get One" (Don Schlitz, Vince Gill) - 2:58
"Sure Thing" (Wood, Verlon Thompson) - 3:00
"I Want It All" (Wood, John Tirro) - 3:19
"Use Mine" (Lisa Drew, Steve Seskin) - 4:07
"Between the Earth and the Stars" (Richard Wold, John David) - 4:19

Personnel
As listed in liner notes.
Eddie Bayers - drums
Michael Black - background vocals
Bruce Bouton - steel guitar, Dobro
Mark Casstevens - acoustic guitar, banjo
Mike Chapman - bass guitar
Marty Churchill - background vocals
Larry Franklin - fiddle
Vince Gill - mandolin, guitar solo (track 6)
Nicole Hassman - background vocals
Tim Hensley - background vocals
John Hobbs - keyboards, strings
Dann Huff - electric guitar, 12-string guitar, gut string guitar
Paul Leim - percussion
Greg Morrow - drums
Steve Nathan - strings
Don Potter - acoustic guitar
John Wesley Ryles - background vocals
Eric Silver - mandolin, banjo
Billy Joe Walker Jr. - acoustic guitar

References

Jeff Wood (singer) albums
Imprint Records albums
1997 debut albums
Albums produced by Mark Bright (record producer)